The ABU Radio Song Festival 2016 was the fourth edition of the ABU Radio Song Festivals, organised by the Asia-Pacific Broadcasting Union (ABU). Originally a biennial event, the festival organisers changed its format to an annual festival commencing from 2014. The festival took place on 26 April 2016 in Beijing, China. Thirteen songs from ten countries took part in the festival.

Location

It was announced that the 2016 ABU Radio Song Festival would take place in Beijing, China.

Format 
Unlike the format used in the Eurovision Song Contest there are two versions of the Song Festivals, ABU Radio and ABU TV Song Festivals. The ABU Radio Song Festival took place alongside the Radio Asia 2016 event took place in April 2016.

Host broadcaster
China National Radio (CNR), was the host broadcaster for the festival on 26 April 2016.

Participating Countries
A total of thirteen countries took part in this years festival. Host country China made their début in this years festival along with Macau, Nepal, Romania and Turkmenistan. Brunei withdrew from the contest. The following entries had been selected by the ABU to participate in the final of the ABU Radio Song Festival 2016.

Did Not Qualify 
Of the seventeen preliminary entries, thirteen were selected to proceed to the final of the ABU Radio Song Festival. The remaining four songs did not qualify (as shown in the following table)

Other countries 
  - Radio Televisyen Brunei (RTB) announced on 20 February 2016 that they had not been invited to the festival, making their participation unlikely.

See also 

 ABU Song Festivals
 Asia-Pacific Broadcasting Union
 Eurovision Song Contest 2016
 Eurovision Young Musicians 2016

References

External links 
Official website of ABU Radio Song Festival

2016 in Chinese music
Radio 2016
2010s in Beijing
2016 song contests
Music festivals in China